Boot Hill is the name for a number of cemeteries, chiefly in the American West.

Boot Hill may also refer to:
 Boot Hill (video game), an arcade game from Midway
 Boot Hill (film), a western starring Terence Hill
 Boot Hill (role-playing game), a role-playing game from TSR, Inc.
 Boot Hill Bowl, a now defunct post-season college football game played in Dodge City, Kansas
 "Boot Hill", a song performed by artists such as Johnny Winter and Stevie Ray Vaughan
 Boot Hill, a mountain in Mare Tranquillitatis on the moon
Boot Hill Museum in Dodge City, Kansas
 Boot Hill, another name for the fielding position of short leg in cricket, see Glossary of cricket terms#B